Sunde is a neighborhood (delområde) in the city of Stavanger which lies in the southwestern part of the large municipality of Stavanger in Rogaland county, Norway. It is located in the borough of Madla, located along the Hafrsfjorden, just south of Kvernevik. Sunde Church is located in this neighborhood.

References

Boroughs and neighbourhoods of Stavanger